Uehling may refer to:

Places
Uehling, Nebraska, United States

People
Barbara Uehling, American educator
Edwin Albrecht Uehling, American physicist
Uehling potential named after E.A. Uehling
O. C. Uehling, American architect
Robert Uehling, American politician

See also
Ühlingen-Birkendorf